Antonangelo Casula (born 16 June 1958) is an Italian politician who served as Mayor of Carbonia for three consecutive terms (1990–2001) and Undersecretary of State in the Prodi II Cabinet (2006–2008).

References

External links

1958 births
Living people
Mayors of Carbonia
Italian Communist Party politicians
Democratic Party of the Left politicians
Democrats of the Left politicians